Frederick James "Jock" Granter (6 March 1921 – 14 May 2012) was an Australian politician.

He was born in Gardenvale to estate agent Donald Frederick Forster Granter and his wife Marion. After attending Gardenvale Central School and Caulfield Grammar School he became a bank officer in 1938, and served in the AIF during World War II from 1941 to 1946. He married Helena Ferrier Thomas on 9 October 1949. In 1954 he changed careers, farming merino sheep in Heathcote, where he became active in the local Liberal Party. In 1964 he was elected to the Victorian Legislative Council as the member for Bendigo, shifting to Central Highlands in 1976. From 1973 to 1981 he was Minister of Water Supply and Forests, moving to Police and Emergency Services in 1981 and standing down from the front bench a year later. He retired from politics in 1988.

References

1921 births
2012 deaths
Liberal Party of Australia members of the Parliament of Victoria
Members of the Victorian Legislative Council
Australian military personnel of World War II
People from the City of Glen Eira
Politicians from Melbourne
Military personnel from Melbourne
People educated at Caulfield Grammar School